The 1939 North Cornwall by-election was a parliamentary by-election held on 13 July 1939 for the House of Commons constituency of North Cornwall.

Previous MP 
The seat had become vacant when the constituency's Liberal Member of Parliament, the Rt Hon. Sir Francis Dyke Acland, Bt. died. Acland was first elected for this seat in the 1932 North Cornwall by-election and retained it until his death.

Previous Result 

 Note on 1935 result: Change and swing are calculated from the result of the by-election on 22 July 1932.

Candidates 
The Liberal Party candidate was Tom Horabin (1896 – 26 April 1956). He was a business consultant with no local ties and no track record as an election candidate. He was a close friend of John Foot, the influential Liberal candidate for neighbouring Bodmin.
The Conservative candidate was E.R. Whitehouse. He had previously contested the seat at the 1935 United Kingdom general election. The local Labour party had already selected D.C.N. Wakley to contest the forthcoming General Election. However, Labour party Headquarters successfully put pressure on the local Labour party to withdraw their candidate. The action of the Labour HQ was a clear indication of a desire to electorally co-operate with the Liberal party at a forthcoming General Election, along the lines of a Popular Front.

Result 
The by-election took place shortly before the start of the Second World War. 

It was the last peacetime by-election won by the Liberal Party until the 1958 Torrington by-election.

Aftermath 

Tom Horabin was the Liberal Party Chief Whip from August 1945 until he resigned and left the party in October 1946. He continued to represent North Cornwall until the 1950 general election, first as an Independent and then as a Labour MP from November 1947. In 1950 Horabin contested Exeter, but did not return to the House of Commons.

See also

 1932 North Cornwall by-election
 North Cornwall constituency
 List of United Kingdom by-elections (1931–1950)
 United Kingdom by-election records

References
 British Parliamentary Election Results 1918-1949, compiled and edited by F.W.S. Craig (Macmillan Press 1977)
 British Parliamentary Election Results 1950-1973, compiled and edited by F.W.S. Craig (Parliamentary Research Services 1983)
 Who's Who of British Members of Parliament, Volume III 1919-1945, edited by M. Stenton and S. Lees (Harvester Press 1979)
 Who's Who of British Members of Parliament, Volume IV 1945-1979, edited by M. Stenton and S. Lees (Harvester Press 1981)

1939 elections in the United Kingdom
1939 in England
By-elections to the Parliament of the United Kingdom in Cornish constituencies
1930s in Cornwall